Duttlenheim is a commune in the Bas-Rhin department in Grand Est in north-eastern France.

Arsène Wenger, former long-time manager of Arsenal F.C., grew up here. His parents ran the bistro La croix d'or, where he would spend hours studying the behaviour of the football-loving customers.

See also
 Communes of the Bas-Rhin department

References

Communes of Bas-Rhin